Sporting B.C. (Greek: ΚΑΕ Σπόρτιγκ) is a Greek professional basketball team that is located at Ano Patissia, Athens, Greece, at the area of Elia Zervou 89 and Sarantaporoy. The club's full name is A.O. Sporting Athens B.C. (Greek: Α.Ο. Σπόρτιγκ Αθήνα KAE).

History
The A.O. Sporting parent athletic association was founded in 1936, after a group of Greeks moved the Sporting Istanbul (Constantinople) club that had been founded in 1924, to Athens. Sporting began with sports departments in basketball and volleyball, and later added the sports of boxing, swimming, and ping pong. Today, the A.O. Sporting athletic club has only the basketball department, A.O. Sporting B.C.

Over the years, some of the players from Sporting B.C. played for the senior men's Greek National Basketball Team. The team competed in the FIBA Korać Cup competition in the 1979–80, 1980–81, 1995–96, and 1996–97 seasons. Sporting won the Greek Second Division championship three times, in 1988, 1991 and 2007.

In international competitions

Arena

Sporting B.C. plays its home games at the 2,500 seat Sporting Sports Arena.

Titles and honors
National:
Greek 2nd Division: (3)
1988, 1991, 2007

Notable players

Greece:
  Dinos Angelidis
  Georgios Barlas
 - Dave Caligaris
  Christos Christodoulou
  Kostas Diamantopoulos
  Vangelis Karampoulas
  Fotis Katsikaris
  Georgios Kolokithas
  Nikos Liakopoulos
  Georgios Limniatis
  Faidon Matthaiou
  Dimitris Papanikolaou
  Kostas Petropoulos
  Ioannis Sioutis
  Pavlos Stamelos
  Vassilis Symtsak
  Nick Tsiotos

Europe:
 - Nikola Radulović

USA:
  Mitchell Wiggins
  Alphonso Ford
  Derrick Hamilton
  Tony Costner
  Tony Dumas
  John Hudson
  Brian Vaughns
  Malcolm Mackey
  Donald Williams

Rest of Americas:
  Andres Guibert

Head coaches
  Kostas Diamantopoulos
  Steve Giatzoglou
  Vassilis Fragkias
  Kostas Petropoulos
  Aris Lykogiannis
  Angelos Koronios

See also
Sporting Athens women's basketball

References

External links
Sportingbc.gr Official Team Website 
Eurobasket.com Team Profile

 
Basketball teams in Greece
Basketball teams established in 1936